John Chandler Holloway (July 7, 1826 – February 26, 1901) was a member of the Wisconsin State Assembly and the Wisconsin State Senate.

Biography
Holloway was born on July 7, 1826 in York, New York. Later, he moved to Lancaster, Wisconsin. Chandler died in Cloverdale, California on February 26, 1901.

Career
Holloway was a member of the Assembly during the 1871 session and of the Senate from the 16th District during the 1872, 1873, 1874 and 1875 session. In 1874, he was chosen to be President Pro Tem. Previously, Holloway was Chairman of the Town Board of Lancaster from 1857 to 1861. He was a Republican.

References

External links

People from York, New York
People from Lancaster, Wisconsin
Mayors of places in Wisconsin
Republican Party Wisconsin state senators
Republican Party members of the Wisconsin State Assembly
1826 births
1901 deaths
19th-century American politicians